Chingon or chingón may refer to:
Chingon (band), a band started by director Robert Rodríguez
Chingona, a dice game
chingón -Spanish profanity

See also
Chignon (disambiguation)